Nicholas Monroe and Simon Stadler were the defending champions, but decided not to participate.

Marco Crugnola and Daniele Giorgini won the final against Alex Bolt and Peng Hsien-yin 4–6, 7–5, [10–8].

Seeds

Draw

Draw

References
 Main Draw

Aspria Tennis Cup - Trofeo CDI - Doubles
2013 - Doubles